Bryan Taylor may refer to:
 John Bryan Taylor (born 1929), British physicist
 Bryan Taylor (cyclist) (born 1968), English cyclist
 Bryan Taylor (soccer) (born 1975), retired American soccer midfielder
 Bryan Taylor (lawyer) (born 1976), member of the Alabama Senate

See also
Brian Taylor (disambiguation)